George Arthur Weekes (b Clifton, Bristol 5 September 1869; d Cambridge 23 June 1953) was a 20th-century British academic.

Weekes was educated at Bristol Grammar School and Sidney Sussex College, Cambridge. He became a Fellow of Sidney Sussex in 1893; Chaplain in 1894; Praelector in 1895; Tutor in 1905; Senior proctor in 1906 and Master in 1918. He was Vice-Chancellor of the University of Cambridge from 1926 to 1928. He was appointed a Canon of Ely in 1935, and retired in 1945.

References 

1869 births
1953 deaths
Alumni of Sidney Sussex College, Cambridge
20th-century English Anglican priests
Vice-Chancellors of the University of Cambridge
Fellows of Sidney Sussex College, Cambridge
Masters of Sidney Sussex College, Cambridge
Academics from Bristol
People educated at Bristol Grammar School